Boynton Township is located in Tazewell County, Illinois. As of the 2010 census, its population was 275 and it contained 94 housing units. Formed as Boyington Township in November, 1854, but the name was changed to Boynton on an unknown date.

Geography

Demographics

References

External links
City-data.com
Illinois State Archives

Townships in Tazewell County, Illinois
Peoria metropolitan area, Illinois
Townships in Illinois